Nilio is a genus of false lady beetles found in the Neotropics. It is the only genus in the Darkling beetle subfamily Nilioninae.

References

Tenebrionoidea